Daphlapur State, also spelled Daflepur, was a Hindu petty princely state of British India. It was a former Maratha territory, one of the former Southern Maratha Jagirs (feudal estates).
 
Daphlapur State and neighbouring Jath State were the only two states belonging to the Bijapur Agency under the Bombay Presidency, which later would become part of the colonial Deccan States Agency.

The state had six villages with an area of only  and a population of 6,006 inhabitants in 1881.

History 
The state was founded in 1680 as Daphlapur. Following British rule in the area it came under the collector of Bijapur District, together with larger Jath State. The third widow of the last ruler, Ranibai Lakshmibai Saheb, died without succession and the dynasty line of the state became extinguished. Then Daphlapur ended up being annexed by Jath State on 27 January 1917.

Rulers 
The rulers of the state belonged to the Dafle dynasty and bore the (rarely modest) title of Deshmukh.

On 27 January 1917, the state was incorporated into Jath, whose rulers (also styled Deshmukh) shared the same Dafle bloodline, owing to lack of succession and were awarded a Privy Purse of 49,924 Rupees. The joint state ceased to exist on 8 March 1948 by accession to Bombay state.

Deshmukhs  
1680 – 1703             Satvaji Rao I                     (d. 1706)
1703 – 1704             Bovaji Rao                        (d. 1704)
1704 – 1748             Yesu Bai "Au Sahib" (female)      (d. 1754)
1748 – 1759             Yeshwant Rao                      (d. 1759)
1759 – 1790             Amrit Rao I                       (d. 1790)
1790 – 1810             Khanji Rao                        (b. 17.. – d. 1810)
1810 – 1822             Renuka Bai (female) – Regent      (d. 1822) (administrator from 1816)
1822 – December 1885    Satvaji Rao II                    (b. 1797 – d. 1885)
Dec 1885 – 13 Jan 1917  Ranibai Lakshmibai Saheb (female) (b. 1834 – d. 1917)

See also 
 Maratha Empire
 List of Maratha dynasties and states
 List of princely states of British India (alphabetical)

References 

Princely states of Maharashtra
Sangli district
1686 establishments in Asia